Hurricane Ioke, also referred to as Typhoon Ioke, was a record breaking, long-lived and extremely powerful storm that traversed the Pacific for 17 days, reaching the equivalent of Category 5 status on the Saffir–Simpson hurricane scale on three different occasions. It was the most intense hurricane ever recorded in the Central Pacific, as well as the fifth-most intense Pacific hurricane on record, tied with 1973's Hurricane Ava. Ioke was the ninth named storm, fifth hurricane, and third major hurricane of the active 2006 Pacific hurricane season.

The cyclone developed in the Intertropical Convergence Zone on August 20 far to the south of Hawaii. Encountering warm waters, little wind shear, and well-defined outflow, Ioke intensified from a tropical depression to Category 4 status within 48 hours. Late on August 22, it rapidly weakened to Category 2 status before crossing over Johnston Atoll. Two days later, favorable conditions again allowed for rapid strengthening, and Ioke attained Category 5 status on August 25 before crossing the International Date Line. Ioke gradually weakened as it turned northwestward and northward, and by September 6, it had transitioned into an extratropical cyclone. The remnants of Ioke accelerated northeastward and ultimately crossed into the Bering Sea, and then the Gulf of Alaska.

Ioke did not affect any permanently-populated areas in the Central Pacific or Western Pacific basins as a hurricane or a typhoon. The typhoon left moderate damage on Wake Island totaling $88 million (2006 USD, equivalent to $ million in ), including blown off roofs and damaged buildings, though the infrastructure of the island was left intact; all military personnel were evacuated from the island. Later, the extratropical remnants of Ioke produced a severe storm surge along the Alaskan coastline, causing beach erosion.

Meteorological history 

The Intertropical Convergence Zone (ITCZ) spawned a tropical disturbance with a low-level circulation far to the southeast of Hawaii in the middle of August 2006. Under the influence of a strong westward-moving subtropical ridge to its north, the disturbance tracked nearly due westward, with deep convection in the region increasing and decreasing on a daily basis. At the time, there was no convection associated with the ITCZ within 10° Longitude. The depression attained tropical storm status within six hours of developing. The Central Pacific Hurricane Center designated the system with the name Ioke , Hawaiian for the name Joyce. Subsequently, Ioke quickly strengthened, and by late on August 20 the storm developed a central dense overcast and the beginnings of an eyewall; early on August 21 the storm intensified into a hurricane, just 24 hours after first developing.

Hurricane Ioke steadily deepened as it continued west-northwestward, with better definition of the eye and deepening of the eyewall convection. After turning westward later in the day, wind shear began to decrease, allowing a second period of rapid deepening.

After maintaining Category 5 status for about 18 hours, Ioke weakened slightly due to an eyewall replacement cycle. Completing the cycle on August 26, the hurricane restrengthened to Category 5 status. The trough to its west tracked further away from the hurricane, allowing the subtropical ridge to build ahead of the hurricane which turned Ioke to the southwest. The overall environment remained very favorable for sustainment of the powerful cyclone. Strong upper-level cyclones far to its northwest provided outflow channels and light wind shear, with warm water temperatures along its path.

Unofficially referred as a super typhoon by the Joint Typhoon Warning Center (JTWC), Ioke remained at the equivalence of a Category 5 hurricane for about 12 hours after crossing the Date Line. It then began a slight weakening trend on August 28, due to increased inflow from the ridge to its north. On August 29, the cyclone turned to the west and west-northwest while tracking around the periphery of the subtropical ridge, and Ioke again reached the equivalence of Category 5 status.

By September 1, increased wind shear and drier air caused the eye of Ioke to become cloud-filled and elongated, and by September 2 Ioke was undergoing another eyewall replacement cycle. Gradual weakening continued, and the typhoon steadily shifted its track to the northwest around the subtropical ridge. A deepening trough turned Ioke to the north-northwest and north, and the cyclone weakened to a tropical storm a few hundred miles east of Japan. After accelerating northeastward, the cyclone began losing tropical characteristics, and the JTWC declared Ioke as an extratropical cyclone on September 6. The JMA maintained Ioke as a typhoon until a day later, and maintained Ioke as a tropical cyclone until it was declared extratropical midday on September 6. The extratropical remnants of Ioke were tracked by the JMA until September 7, when it was located near the Aleutian Islands of Alaska. The storm deepened as it approached the Aleutians, and re-developed winds of hurricane-force. The storm entered the Bering Sea on September 8, and after turning eastward, crossed the Aleutian Islands and entered the Gulf of Alaska. The extratropical remnants of Ioke dissipated near southeastern Alaska on September 12.

Preparations and impact

Johnston Atoll 
Late on August 21, about 24 hours prior to its closest approach, the Central Pacific Hurricane Center issued a hurricane warning for uninhabited territory of Johnston Island, due to the uncertainty of whether anyone was on the island. A United States Air Force vessel and a 12-person crew were on the island, and after securing their ship the crew took shelter in a hurricane-proof concrete bunker. The crew sustained no injuries, and their ship received only minor damage. Hurricane Ioke, with a portion of its eye crossing the atoll, left an estimated 15% of the palm trees on the island with their tops blown off, with some ironwood trees blown over; the island bird population was unaffected. The hurricane produced rough surf which washed away a portion of a sea wall and an adjacent road.

Wake Island 

Under the threat of the typhoon for several days, two C-17 Globemaster III airlifters evacuated between 188–200 military personnel from Wake Island to Hawaii, the first full-scale evacuation of the island since Typhoon Sarah in 1967. Before the typhoon passed just north of the island, an anemometer recorded hurricane-force winds with a peak wind gust of  before the instrument stopped reporting. The minimum central pressure recorded on the island was 934 mbar at 0906 UTC on August 31.

The powerful winds of Typhoon Ioke caused extensive damage to the island's power grid, leaving most power lines to buildings and backup generators damaged. The combination of the winds and storm surge flooding damaged 70% of the buildings in the territory, many of which with moderate roof damage. All low-lying areas were described as being covered with sea water or sand, and the territory was left without running water. Communications were downed on the island, with satellite dishes and cables destroyed. Damage to the infrastructure was extensive, though repairable and less than expected. Damage on the island was estimated at $88 million (2006 USD).

Japan and Alaska 

On September 1, the Japan Meteorological Agency ordered the temporary evacuation of its staff on Minami-Tori-shima, under threat of the typhoon. The agency expected high waves and winds on the island. Facilities on the island were damaged, although it was repaired and fully operational within three weeks after the storm.

The extratropical remnant of Ioke produced a storm surge and high surf in excess of  along the southwestern coastline of Alaska, which coincided with the astronomical high tide; the combination led to minor flooding along Bristol Bay and Yukon-Kuskokwim Delta. The system produced moderate to heavy rainfall across the western portion of Alaska, including daily rainfall records of 1.15 inches (29 mm) at Bethel and 0.67 in (17 mm) at Kotzebue. Rainfall continued into the southeastern portion of the state, contributing to above-normal rainfall totals near Juneau.

Records and aftermath 

Hurricane Ioke became one of only seven hurricanes to reach Category 5 status on the Saffir-Simpson Hurricane Scale in the Central North Pacific Ocean. The others were Patsy in 1959, Emilia, Gilma, and John in 1994, as well as Lane and Walaka in 2018. With an estimated minimum central pressure of 915 mbar (27.019 inHg), the cyclone attained the lowest estimated surface pressure for any hurricane within the basin, surpassing the previous minimum set by Hurricane Gilma in 1994. Ioke maintained at least Category 4 status for 198 consecutive hours, which was the longest continuous time period at that intensity ever observed for any tropical cyclone anywhere on Earth. Additionally, the cyclone remained at the equivalence of a super typhoon for 174 consecutive hours, which was also a record.

The United States Coast Guard first performed an aerial assessment of damage on Wake Island on September 2, three days after the typhoon struck. The flight indicated an overall damage smaller than expected, and reported a lack of oil spill or hazardous material leak. The U.S. Coast Guard arrived by boat with a team on September 7, with a preliminary damage assessment completed four days later; the team repaired a generator to provide power. The United States Navy's combat stores ship, the USNS San Jose (T-AFS-7), and sixteen members United States Air Force's 36th Contingency Response Group at Andersen AFB, Guam arrived on September 8 and analyzed the stability of the airfield along with assisting in clean-up efforts, and after core tests workers cleared the runway to allow flights onto the territory. On September 13, a group of engineers restored power on the island. About two weeks after the cyclone, several buildings were operational.

The Central Pacific Hurricane Center requested the retirement of the name, and in April 2007, the name Ioke was retired, and replaced with Iopa.

See also 

 List of Category 5 Pacific hurricanes
 Typhoon Olive (1952)
 Typhoon Ophelia (1960)
 Hurricane John (1994) – The second longest-lasting tropical cyclone ever recorded globally.
 Typhoon Oliwa (1997) – A Category 5 super typhoon that crossed the Central Pacific.
 Hurricane Genevieve (2014) – A weak Category 3 hurricane that crossed three basins.
 Hurricane Hector (2018) – An erratic Category 4 hurricane that crossed three basins.
 Hurricane Walaka (2018) – The third most intense hurricane formed in the Central Pacific
 Cyclone Freddy (2023) – The longest lived and highest accumulated cyclone energy (ACE) of any tropical cyclone on record

References

External links

 The CPHC's archive on Hurricane Ioke
 The CPHC's Best Track Data on Hurricane Ioke
 The JMA's Best Track Data on Typhoon Ioke (0612) 
 The JMA's RSMC Best Track Data (Graphics) on Typhoon Ioke (0612)
 The JMA's RSMC Best Track Data (Text)

2006 in Alaska
2006 Pacific hurricane season
2006 Pacific typhoon season
Category 5 Pacific hurricanes
Tropical cyclones in Alaska
Hurricane Ioke
Pacific Northwest storms
Retired Pacific hurricanes
Typhoons
Hurricane Ioke
Ioke